The Kem Kem Group (commonly known as the Kem Kem beds) is a geological group in the Kem Kem region of eastern Morocco, whose strata date back to the Cenomanian stage of the Late Cretaceous. Its strata are subdivided into two geological formations, with the lower Ifezouane Formation and the upper Aoufous Formation, with the Gara Sbaa Formation and Douira Formation used in the southern Tafilalt region. It is exposed on an escarpment along the Algeria–Morocco border.

The unit unconformably overlies Paleozoic marine units of Cambrian, Silurian and Devonian age, and is itself capped by limestone platform rock of Cenomanian-Turonian age. It primarily consists of deltaic deposits. The lower Gara Sbaa Formation primarily consists of fine and medium grained sandstone, while the Douira Formation consists of fining-upwards, coarse-to-fine grained sandstones intercalated with siltstones, variegated mudstones, and occasional thin gypsiferous evaporites.

Dinosaur remains are among the fossils that have been recovered from the group. Recent fossil evidence in the form of isolated large abelisaurid bones and comparisons with other similarly aged deposits elsewhere in Africa indicates that the fauna of the Kem Kem Group (specifically in regard to the numerous predatory theropod dinosaurs) may have been mixed together due to the harsh and changing geology of the region when in reality they would likely have preferred separate habitats and likely would be separated by millions of years.

Vertebrate paleofauna

Cartilaginous fish

Ray-finned fish

Lobe-finned fish

Amphibians

Lizards and snakes

Plesiosaurs

Turtles

Crocodylomorphs

Dinosaurs
Indeterminate lithostrotian remains once misattributed to the Titanosauridae are present in the province of Ksar-es-Souk, Morocco.

Pterosaurs

See also 

 Aoufous Formation, which lies within the Kem Kem Beds
 List of dinosaur-bearing rock formations

References 

Geologic groups of Africa
Geologic formations of Morocco
Upper Cretaceous Series of Africa
Cenomanian Stage
Cretaceous Morocco
Sandstone formations
Paleontology in Morocco
Algeria–Morocco border